The 2012 Tour de Suisse was the 76th running of the Tour de Suisse cycling stage race. It started on 9 June with an individual time trial in Lugano and ended on 17 June, in Sörenberg after nine stages. It was the 17th race of the 2012 UCI World Tour season.

The race was won by  rider Rui Costa, who claimed the leader's yellow jersey after winning the second stage, and maintained the lead of the race until its conclusion holding off attacks from his rivals during the final two stages. Costa's winning margin over runner-up Fränk Schleck of  – the 2010 winner – was fourteen seconds, and 's Levi Leipheimer, the defending champion, completed the podium, seven seconds down on Schleck and twenty-one behind Costa.

In the race's other classifications,  rider Matteo Montaguti won the mountains classification, 's Peter Sagan comfortably won the white jersey for the points classification, having won four stages during the race including the race-opening time trial stage.  finished at the head of the teams classification, winning two of the last three stages through Fredrik Kessiakoff's seventh stage time trial victory and Tanel Kangert winning the final stage.

Participating teams
As the Tour de Suisse was a UCI World Tour event, all eighteen UCI ProTeams were invited automatically and obligated to send a squad. Two other squads –  and  – were given wildcard places into the race, and as such, formed the event's 20-team peloton.

The twenty teams that competed in the race were:

Stages

Stage 1
9 June 2012 — Lugano, individual time trial (ITT)

For the third successive year, the race began with a short individual time trial in around the city of Lugano. Although starting and finishing at relatively the same height above sea level, the stage had a small hill – the western flank of Monte Brè – around midway through the  parcours, being used in the race for the second year in succession, after then-world time trial champion Fabian Cancellara won the stage in a time of 9' 41" in 2011. Race organisers expected the best time for the stage to be four seconds slower than Cancellara's time from 2011, predicting a winning time of 9' 45" for the stage.

The first rider to depart the start in Lugano was  rider Will Routley, who recorded a time of 11' 33" for the course. His stay at the top of the timesheets was short, as the next two riders – 's Daniele Colli and Chris Anker Sørensen for  – went substantially quicker than his time. Berard's team-mate Martin Elmiger was the first rider to record a time below ten minutes, beating Löfkvist's time by eleven seconds to set a time of 9' 54".

Elmiger held the top spot for all of fifteen minutes as  neo-pro Moreno Moser recorded the quickest time at the intermediate point  into the stage, and maintained that form to the finish line, setting a time of 9' 50" to surpass the time of Elmiger by four seconds. The times of Moser and Elmiger remained untroubled for the majority of the following riders, and it was not until Cancellara took to the course, around two hours after they had completed their efforts, that their times came under significant pressure. Cancellara was nine seconds slower than Moser at the intermediate time-point, but paced the second half of the course more efficiently and was three seconds quicker at the end of the stage. As Cancellara was finishing, Sagan was starting the course and was six seconds quicker to the same time-point; Cancellara closed out the course quicker, but Sagan held on by four seconds to take the stage victory. Moser and Elmiger maintained third and fourth to the end, with the top five being rounded out by  rider Fredrik Kessiakoff.

Stage 2
10 June 2012 — Verbania (Italy) to Verbier, 

The race's second stage started across the Swiss border, in the Italian city of Verbania on the shores of Lake Maggiore. The parcours featured two categorised climbs during its  itinerary; of which both were rated as hors catégorie and both came as the race returned to Swiss soil. Although the points were on offer with under  to go, the route climbed slightly further to the finish line.

The former team's Alessandro Bazzana was the instigator as soon as the race left Verbania, and was later joined by Ryan Anderson as the two riders quickly set up an advantage over the main field. As such, after only  of racing, the pairing held an advantage of around ten minutes over the peloton, but this was cut by half as the race entered Switzerland. Anderson took the maximum haul of points at the top of the Simplonpass ahead of Bazzana, while the peloton had closed to four minutes behind at that point, but soon slowed down and the advantage was back out towards eight minutes at the foot of the descent. Sagan also took maximum points at the following intermediate sprint several kilometres later in Sembrancher, which also gave him six bonus seconds towards the general classification.

Gerdemann's team-mate Fränk Schleck – the winner of the race in 2010 – was next to attack, and gathered more ground than what ten Dam achieved, with no immediate reaction from the main field. Schleck had built up a 30-second lead with  remaining, when John Gadret attacked. He was brought back, but soon caught up with a secondary move by 's Tom Danielson.  rider Rui Costa soon accelerated past both riders and set off after Schleck, who was tiring in the closing stages. Costa, who moved into the race lead with his result, later dedicated his performance to his former team-mate Mauricio Soler, who won the second stage of the 2011 edition of the race, before he suffered serious injuries during a sixth stage crash from which he is still recovering from.

Stage 3
11 June 2012 — Martigny to Aarberg, 

The parcours for the stage had several uncategorised hills during its  itinerary; indeed, for the points and mountains classifications, points were on offer in the final  circuit around Aarberg. In that final  circuit, there were two intermediate sprint points in Wiler and Uettligen, as well as the two categorised climbs; a third-category climb at Frienisberg, and a fourth-category pass on the Aarbergstrasse, with the latter coming at around  before the finish in Aarberg itself. There was a fast-paced start to the stage with several short and punchy attacks, but were closed down immediately.

The leaders got clear by over seven minutes in the early running of the stage, which eventually reached a margin of eleven minutes approaching the midpoint of the stage where rain started to fall once again. In Murten, a railway crossing closed with members of those teams able to get through while the rest of the field had to wait until it was cleared; race commissaires later ruled that the riders – around twenty in total – that got through the crossing without waiting were ordered to drop back to the peloton once again. With  to go, the three leaders still held an advantage of around eight minutes. Vangenechten dropped back at Frienisberg, while Mørkøv and Bonnafond managed to resist capture until inside the final kilometre, which ultimately set up the bunch sprint. The sprint itself was won by 's Peter Sagan for his tenth victory of the season, ahead of 's Baden Cooke and  rider Ben Swift. Costa maintained his overall lead, finishing within the peloton three seconds later.

Stage 4
12 June 2012 — Aarberg to Trimbach-Olten, 

Having started from the previous day's finish in Aarberg, the fourth stage saw the itinerary take in several uncategorised passes in the early kilometres of the  parcours, before the first-category Scheltenpass at the  mark. Having descended from the climb, the race went over several small hills before entering a  finishing circuit around the towns of Trimbach and Olten. During the finishing circuit, there were two more categorised climbs; the third-category Unterer Hauenstein and the second-category Salhöhe, with the latter climb summiting at  remaining. The riders then descended back into Trimbach, via the second and final intermediate sprint point, for the finish.

Two nine-rider groups tried to get clear in the run up to the Scheltenpass, but only the second wave managed to gain a sufficient advantage after the first wave was closed down by the peloton. Nine different teams were represented in the group, with  rider Dario Cataldo best-placed of the riders – having started the stage in 21st position – 1' 15" behind the overall leader, 's Rui Costa.

's Greg Van Avermaet and  rider Martin Elmiger also caught up to Cataldo, and like Nordhaug, dropped him on the Salhöhe; ultimately, the main field caught back to them all, with  doing the majority of the work on the front. Ultimately, it was the team's sprinter Peter Sagan that took the stage victory, his third in four days and eleventh of the season. Sagan praised the work of his team-mates after the stages, giving special mention to Moreno Moser after he had closed down the attacks in the closing stages. Costa maintained his 8-second overall lead, as all the main contenders finished within the peloton.

Stage 5
13 June 2012 — Olten-Trimbach to Gansingen, 

Third-category climbs were prominent in the itinerary for the fifth stage, with six in total during the  parcours, of which two – the Bürersteig and Kaistenberg passes – were climbed twice. These climbs were carried out in such a manner, as two laps of a  finishing circuit around Gansingen were completed before the finish. Once again, the stage was run in conditions of heavy rain, but this did not stop some riders trying to break away from the main field within the opening  of the stage. Among those were sprinters Tom Boonen and 's Elia Viviani but neither rider could establish a sufficient gap from the peloton.

The advantage remained between eight and ten minutes for the majority of the stage, and as the breakaway moved onto their final lap of the circuit, it looked likely that they would stay away and move up the general classification as a result. Lodewyck was the first to launch an attack halfway around the finishing circuit, and was closed down by Isaichev who brought the rest of the group back up to him.

On the second climb of the Kaistenberg, Lodewyck was dropped – due to being physically "broken" – as Pérez pushed the tempo higher, making two attacks off the front but Isaichev closed him down on both occasions. Oss and Kroon both launched solo moves as a disjointed wave of attacks continued in the closing stages, and momentarily split into two small groups before reforming as a group of six with around  remaining of the stage. Minard, Pérez and Oss were slightly clear as they passed under the flamme rouge indicating  to go, but Isaichev, Kroon and Puccio pulled back up to the other trio and the six battled it out for the stage victory. Viviani led the main field across the line over eleven minutes down in eighth place, with Costa maintaining his 8-second overall lead for another day.

Stage 6
14 June 2012 — Wittnau to Bischofszell, 

The sixth stage was seen as the final chance for the sprinters to take a stage victory during the race with an individual time trial and two mountainous stages still to be contested over the remaining three days. These climbs were also part of two finishing circuits of a -long loop – with each climb categorised on an alternate lap, along with intermediate sprints at Waldkirch and Muolen – while the finish in Bischofszell was uphill and narrow, and pavé featured within the final  of the stage.

With Bertogliati just 1' 45" behind overall leader Rui Costa overnight, the peloton were keeping a close margin to the breakaway in the early stages of the breakaway, but Bertogliati later dropped back to the peloton in order for the advantage to be extended. The sprint finish was thus set up, and despite being hemmed in towards the barriers by 's Michael Albasini, Peter Sagan out-sprinted 's Ben Swift and Albasini's team-mate Allan Davis for his fourth win of the race. Costa maintained his overall lead of eight seconds into the individual time trial.

Stage 7
15 June 2012 — Gossau, individual time trial (ITT)

Unlike most individual time trials, race organisers created a hilly and technical parcours with several climbs located within its scheduled  distance. As was customary of time trial stages, the riders set off in reverse order from where they were ranked in the general classification at the end of the previous stage.

Robert ultimately recorded a time of 51' 31" for the course, but was instantaneously beaten by 's Pablo Urtasun; Urtasun finished just one second behind on the road, having made up the gap of one minute between the starting times of the two riders. Having passed Grega Bole of  before the finish, Nikita Novikov lowered the benchmark to below 50 minutes, as the  rider recorded a time of 49' 22" for the course.  rider Stuart O'Grady got closest to Novikov's time, finishing a second off, before it was eventually beaten by Fabian Cancellara, riding for the  team. Cancellara completed the course almost three minutes faster than Novikov, recording a time of 46' 38". Cancellara's time held for around half an hour before Fredrik Kessiakoff surprisingly bettered his time by two seconds; Kessiakoff's time was ultimately good enough for the stage victory, his first since the Tour of Austria in July 2011. Costa extended his overall lead to fifty seconds after recording the eighth-fastest time of 47' 17" for the course; Kessiakoff's team-mate Roman Kreuziger moved into second, as Fränk Schleck dropped to fifth overall, while a fifth-place performance for the stage by 's Robert Gesink moved him into third overall, five seconds behind Kreuziger.

Stage 8
16 June 2012 — Bischofszell to Arosa, 

Following the previous day's individual time trial in Gossau, the race returned to the town of Bischofszell – the finishing town of the race's sixth stage – for the start to the penultimate stage. Having reached the town of Altstätten, the roads levelled out and the succeeding  was relatively flat before the uphill finish to Arosa, incorporating two categorised climbs.

Albasini and Velits increased their pace at the front of the field, which split the lead quartet apart, as Dekker and Cusin could not sustain the accelerated tempo.

That pairing were eventually swept up by the peloton. Costa was struggling at the rear, and eventually became dislodged at the back. The attacking trio maintained a gap off the front all the way to the finish in Arosa, finishing 1' 15" behind Albasini, moving Schleck and Leipheimer into the top three and Nieve into fifth overall. Costa finished 50 seconds behind that group, thanks to help from team-mate Alejandro Valverde, holding on to the leader's jersey by 14 seconds ahead of Schleck.

Stage 9
17 June 2012 — Näfels-Lintharena to Sörenberg, 

With six riders within a minute of  rider Rui Costa – the overall leader – the final, and queen, stage was set up for numerous attacks and the potential for one of the contenders, including 's Fränk Schleck, to try a solo move and possibly claim the race as a whole. On the finishing circuit were two hors catégorie climbs; the Glaubenbielen  into the lap, having climbed yet further from the finish line, as well as the Glaubenberg about halfway around the circuit. The summit of the final climb – the Südelhöhe – came with just  before the finish in Sörenberg.

Mini-attacks set the course of the early running of the stage, with the field remaining as a whole for the first hour of racing after the attacks were closed down within minutes. As it was, it was not until  into the stage that the breakaway was formed. This was not to last however, as Schleck's  team were setting the tempo on the front of the peloton via riders Grégory Rast and Linus Gerdemann.

The pace was maintained all the way until after the Glaubenbielen, where Schleck primed himself for an attack, and eventually did so on the Glaubenberg, countering a move by 's Mikel Nieve, who had been fifth overnight. Schleck's move forced the other overall contenders to form a chase group in order to bring him back; Nieve and Costa were joined in the group by amongst others, Robert Gesink and Tom Danielson, fifth and seventh overall respectively. Schleck's advantage grew to a maximum of around one minute, but the chase group were able to re-establish contact with Schleck, and thus negating the chance for anyone to get clear. Up front, Kangert, Roy and Montaguti had dropped their two breakaway companions, before Montaguti himself was dropped; he eventually finished 31 seconds down in third. Kangert and Roy were left to contend the sprint, where Roy launched his sprint first but fatigue got the better of him, leaving Kangert to take the victory, a result that he could not believe at the end. Costa finished 1' 48" behind Kangert in a group with Schleck, Gesink, Nieve and 's Levi Leipheimer, to take his first overall World Tour win, and the biggest win of his career to date.

Classification leadership table
In the 2012 Tour de Suisse, four different jerseys were awarded. For the general classification, calculated by adding each cyclist's finishing times on each stage, and allowing time bonuses in intermediate sprints and at the finish in mass-start stages, the leader received a yellow jersey. This classification was considered the most important of the 2012 Tour de Suisse, and the winner of the classification was considered the winner of the race. There was also a mountains classification, the leadership of which was marked by a green jersey. In the mountains classification, points were won by reaching the top of a climb before other cyclists, with more points available for the higher-categorised climbs; there were twenty-four categorised climbs in the race, split into five distinctive categories.

The third jersey represented the points classification, marked by a white-and-red jersey. In the points classification, cyclists got points for finishing highly in a stage. For stages 3 to 6, the win earned 25 points, second place earned 20 points, third 16, fourth 13, fifth 11, and one point fewer per place down to a single point for 15th. For all other stages, the win earned 15 points, second place earned 12 points, third 10, and one point fewer per place down to a single point for 12th. Points could also be earned at intermediate sprints for finishing in the top 3 at intermediate sprint points during each stage on a 6–3–1 scale. The fourth jersey represented the Swiss rider classification, marked by a red jersey. This was calculated in the same manner as the general classification, calculated by adding each Swiss cyclist's finishing times on each stage. There was also a classification for teams, in which the times of the best three cyclists per team on each stage were added together; the leading team at the end of the race was the team with the lowest total time.

References

External links

Tour de Suisse
Tour de Suisse
Tour de Suisse